John Beam Vreeland (December 30, 1852July 1, 1923) was an attorney and Republican Party politician from Morristown, New Jersey. He served in the New Jersey Senate and as the United States Attorney for the district of New Jersey.

Early life
John B. Vreeland was born in Newark, New Jersey, December 30, 1852 to Sarah M. Smith Vreeland and George Washington Vreeland. Both his parent were natives of Passaic County where his father was in the soda-water bottling business. He attended  public schools in Newark, and completed Newark High School (since renamed as Barringer High School) at the age of fifteen. He then accompanied his parents in 1868 to Morristown, where he would continue to live. For the following four years he was associated with his father in business. Then having decided to go into the professional of law, he entered the office of Frederick G. Burnham and later that of Colonel Frederick A. DeMott, and so closely did he apply himself that he was admitted to the bar as an attorney and solicitor in chancery, November 1875, and as a counsellor in June, 1879.

Legal career and politics
He then began practicing law in Morristown, from 1876 to 1879 he was partnered with Edward A. Quayle. He then practiced alone for almost a quarter century. On April 1, 1903, he became a senior member of the firm Vreeland, King, Wilson & Lindabury. This firm dissolved on April 7, 1912, with  Vreeland forming a partnership with C. Franklin Wilson, the firm name was, Vreeland & Wilson, with offices on No. 21 South street. His prominence in law was due solely to his thorough preparation for his work, the fidelity he has always displayed to the interests of his clients, and the zeal and enthusiasm he had brought to bear upon each and every case entrusted to his care.

Mr. Vreeland has always been prominently identified with the best interests of his city, county, and State, and to the best of his ability has performed the duties of the various offices conferred upon him. In 1892 Chancellor McGill appointed him a special master in chancery. He has served as deputy county clerk and acting prosecutor of pleas of the county of Morris, and as city counsel of Morristown. In 1895 the Republican party nominated him for the office of State senator, to which he was elected by a plurality of over 1,500, a most conclusive evidence of his popularity and efficiency. During his membership in that body he introduced a bill known as "The School Teachers’ Retirement Fund Bill," which became law in 1896, also a number of other bills of less importance, and served on several committees, the most important being that on the revision of laws, and he was also chairman of the joint committee on state hospitals for the insane. He was appointed by the acting governor of New Jersey,  Foster M. Voorhees, to the office of judge of the several courts of Morris county, for a term of five years, dating from April 1, 1898, a position for which he had many qualifications. On October 20, 1903, he was appointed United States attorney for the district of New Jersey, ad interim; was appointed to the same position December 16, 1903, for a full term of four years, and was reappointed December 9, 1907, for another four-year term, all these appointments having been made by President Roosevelt.

Miscellaneous 
Vreeland was an active member of the South Street Presbyterian Church of Morristown, to the support of which he contributes most liberally. He is a member of F. and A. M., Cincinnati Lodge; from May 1, 1912 to May 7, 1913 he served as president of County Bar Association of Morris county, New Jersey.

References

19th-century American politicians
19th-century American lawyers
20th-century American politicians
20th-century American lawyers
American Freemasons
American people of English descent
Barringer High School alumni
County judges in the United States
New Jersey lawyers
Republican Party New Jersey state senators
People from Morristown, New Jersey
Politicians from Newark, New Jersey
United States Attorneys for the District of New Jersey
1852 births
1923 deaths